Seongjin Jeup clan is one of the Korean clans. Their Bon-gwan is in Kimchaek, North Hamgyong Province. According to the research held in 2000, the number of Jeup clan of Seongjin was 86. Their founder was  who was born between Korean mother and Japanese father.  was dispatched to Korea as an employee of a railroad company when Korea was colonized by Japan.  was naturalized in his tenth in 1954 followed by his mother. At that time,  founded Jeup clan of Seongjin.

See also
 Korean clan names of foreign origin

References

External links
 

Korean clan names of Japanese origin